Gary Young is a British screenwriter who is perhaps best known for writing the film Harry Brown starring Michael Caine.

He has also written Madam Samurai a graphic novel series with Eagle Award-winning artist David Hitchcock.

Films
 Shooters (2002)
 Spivs (2004)
 The Last Drop (2005)
 The Tournament (2009)
 Harry Brown (2009)
 Henry (TBA)

Comics
 Madam Samurai (with art by David Hitchcock, 2-volume graphic novel series, Scar Comics, 2010, 2011)

References

External links

Madam Samurai.com

Living people
British comics writers
British male screenwriters
Year of birth missing (living people)